Xenorma is a genus of moths of the family Notodontidae. It consists of the following species:
Xenorma australis Prout, 1918
Xenorma biorbiculata  (Warren, 1909) 
Xenorma cytheris  (Druce, 1891) 
Xenorma exturbata Hering, 1925
Xenorma grandimacula Hering, 1925
Xenorma leucocrypta  (Dognin, 1909) 
Xenorma ovata  (Dognin, 1900) 
Xenorma pictifrons  (Warren, 1907) 
Xenorma ravida Miller, 2008

Notodontidae of South America